Guitar Center is an American musical instrument retailer chain. It is the largest company of its kind in the United States, with 294 locations. Its headquarters is in Westlake Village, California.

Guitar Center oversees various subsidiaries including Musician's Friend, AVDG, Music & Arts, Woodwind & Brasswind, and Giardinelli.

History
The company was founded in Hollywood by Wayne Mitchell in 1959 as The Organ Center, a retailer of electronic organs for home and church use. In 1964, after one of Mitchell's suppliers informed him that in order to continue receiving organs he would have to also carry Vox guitar amplifiers, Mitchell added the amps and changed the store's name to The Vox Center, capitalizing on the popularity of The Beatles and their association with the Vox brand. Toward the end of the 1960s, as other brands like Marshall rose in popularity, Mitchell once again changed the name, this time to Guitar Center.

By 1972, Guitar Center had expanded to eight stores, and eventually opened locations in San Francisco and San Diego, as well as several suburbs of Los Angeles. Ray Scherr, previously the General Manager of the San Francisco store, purchased the company from Mitchell in the late 1970s.

The 1980s "guitar rock" revival led by Van Halen and a concurrent influx of Japanese-produced instruments brought guitar sales to unprecedented levels, fueling Guitar Center's further expansion across the United States to become the largest musical instrument retailer in the country.

Scherr sold the company in 1996. The following year, with 30 stores on the West Coast and in Michigan, Ohio, and Florida, Guitar Center made an initial public offering of stock and began opening new locations at an increased rate.

In 2000, Guitar Center acquired mail order and e-commerce retailer Musician's Friend for $50 million, asserting that the merged company was the world's largest seller of musical instruments. Musician's Friend became a wholly owned subsidiary, and remained headquartered in Medford, Oregon.

In 2005, Guitar Center Inc. acquired Music & Arts, the largest band & orchestra dealer in the United States, and merged their American Music Group chain of band and orchestral stores into Music & Arts (as the company was renamed). The same year, Guitar Center, Inc., started The Fender Music Foundation, a nonprofit organization that supports music education.

In Summer 2006, Guitar Center acquired four stores in Texas from the popular South Texas and Central/South American company, Hermes. The same year, Activision partnered with Guitar Center; all purchases made during game play of Guitar Hero, beginning with the second installment, are made in a virtual Guitar Center store.

In February 2007, the direct response division of Guitar Center, Musician's Friend, purchased assets of the Indiana-based company Dennis Bamber, Inc., which included leading band and orchestra retailer Woodwind & Brasswind, plus Music 123 and Lyons Music.

On June 27, 2007, Guitar Center agreed to a $1.9 billion buyout from Bain Capital, totaling $2.1 billion including debt. The deal was led by Goldman Sachs and amounted to a per-share price of $63, or a 26% premium on the June 26 closing price. The deal was approved by shareholders on September 18, 2007, and closed October 9, 2007.

In mid-2009 Guitar Center opened its first rehearsal and lessons studio facility in Woodland Hills, California.

In 2011, Musician's Friend's headquarters operations were gradually consolidated into Guitar Center's facilities in Westlake Village, California. The same year, Guitar Center began offering equipment rentals in one of their San Diego, California stores. Guitar Center has since opened rental departments in ten other existing locations and plans to offer rental services in various other stores across the country.

In May 2013, Standard & Poor's cut its debt rating on Bain Capital-owned Guitar Center Holdings Inc to "junk bond" status, citing struggles with "weak operating trends." The corporate credit rating on the company dropped from 'B−' to 'CCC+'.

In April 2014, Ares Management took a controlling stake in Guitar Center. Bain Capital, Guitar Center's former owner, retained partial ownership of the company, along with representation on the board. According to Mike Pratt, the retailer's previous chief executive, the deal will reduce Guitar Center's total debt and provide it with the resources to expand its footprint and invest in its business.

In August 2014, Guitar Center opened a new 28,000 square foot flagship location in the heart of Times Square in New York City. The grand opening included a celebratory concert featuring the band The Roots. The Guitar Center Times Square location is now the permanent home of Eric Clapton's Blackie Fender Stratocaster, which Guitar Center purchased at a Christie's Crossroads Centre auction in 2004 for $959,000. Due to the pandemic, and Guitar Center’s 2020 bankruptcy filing, the Times Square location is permanently closed.

In April, 2017, Moody's Investors Services revised the outlook on Guitar Center's B2 rating to negative, meaning it could downgrade the rating further into junk territory in the medium term. The concern was that Guitar Center may be overwhelmed by its $1 billion debt in the face of flat sales in the musical instrument industry as a whole.

On November 13, 2020, during the COVID-19 pandemic, Guitar Center announced that it plans to file for Chapter 11 bankruptcy protection after negotiating a debt-cutting deal with key investors and lenders as soon as the weekend of November 14, 2020. Guitar Center said it received up to $165 million in new equity and lenders agreed to reduce its debt by around $800 million. Guitar Center emerged from Chapter 11 bankruptcy on December 23, 2020, after a reorganization deal added additional equity and debt capital.

Guitar Center Legends Collection
The "Guitar Center Legends Collection" consists of four classic guitars made famous by music legends Eric Clapton, Stevie Ray Vaughan, and U2's The Edge. Guitar Center purchased Clapton’s “Blackie” Fender Stratocaster, his vintage Gibson “ES-335,” and Vaughan’s “Lenny” Stratocaster for over $2.4 million from the Clapton Crossroads Centre charity auction at Christie's New York in 2004. They added The Edge’s cream white Gibson Les Paul Custom after purchasing it for $240,000 at the Music Rising Charity Auction in 2007. Over the years, the collection has been exhibited in one-of-a-kind, "Legends' Collection" display cases, which provide high level protection and climate control as the instruments tour prestigious musical events and key Guitar Center locations, such as "Guitar Center Road to Crossroads" held at Madison Square Garden in conjunction with Clapton’s Crossroads Guitar Festival in April 2013. In August 2014, Clapton’s Blackie and ES-335 were moved to their new permanent location at Guitar Center’s Times Square flagship location.
 
Clapton's "Blackie" was purchased by Guitar Center for $959,500. Clapton’s Cherry Red Gibson "335", purchased for $847,500, was used to record Cream’s versions of "Badge" and "Crossroads (from their final live performance in November 1968),” as well as many other historical performances, during his 40 years of ownership. Steve Ray Vaughan’s "Lenny", which was purchased for $623,500, was used to record his classic love songs including "Lenny" and "Riviera Paradise". All of the proceeds from these three guitars purchased by Guitar Center were for the benefit of Clapton’s Crossroads Centre charity.
The Edge's cream colored 1975 Les Paul Custom (faded from its original white) found fame as a go-to guitar for stage and studio on many of U2’s most famous recordings and performances. In 2005, The Edge partnered with producer Bob Ezrin, Gibson and the Guitar Center Music Foundation (now known as the Fender Music Foundation) to establish Music Rising, a charity founded to benefit musicians whose lives were torn apart by Hurricane Katrina. In 2007, he donated this prized guitar to be auctioned for the cause. The winning bid was $240,000 from Guitar Center ($288,000 including Buyers Premium).

Guitar Center's Drum-Off
From 1988 through 2016, Guitar Center conducted an annual search for the next great undiscovered drummer. Developed to spotlight the drumming community, Guitar Center’s Drum-Off is the music retailer’s longest running artist-discovery program. For over 25 years, the program unearthed top undiscovered drummers and provided a platform for established drummers to be acknowledged.

The process of Guitar Center’s Drum-Off began with three rounds of preliminary competitions at each of Guitar Center's 250+ locations nationwide, with each contestant allowed five minutes of set up time and three minutes to perform. One winner from each store finals competition advanced to one of 30 quarterfinal competitions, and one winner from each quarterfinal competition advanced to one of five semifinal competitions, during which contestants were allowed five minutes to perform. The winners from each of these five semifinal competitions qualified to compete in Guitar Center's Drum-Off finals in Los Angeles, California in front of a live audience and a panel of celebrity judges.

In the finals, each contestant was required to perform on a 5-piece acoustic drum kit complete with hardware, cymbals, cowbell, throne and the option to incorporate the Roland SPD-30 Octapad into the competition kit (the SPD-30 was not included in 2016). Contestants were evaluated by a panel of independent and credible judges on the following criteria: skills & technique, groove, originality, stage presence, and overall performance.

Guitar Center discontinued their sponsorship of the annual contest in 2017, announcing that it would instead create a community outreach program specifically geared toward drummers.

Hollywood's RockWalk

The Sunset Boulevard location in Los Angeles hosts Hollywood's RockWalk, a hall of fame honoring musical artists. Founded in 1985, artists are invited to place their handprints into cement blocks that are put on display at the Guitar Center. The inaugural inductees were music gear pioneers Jim Marshall, Robert Moog, Les Paul, and musicians Eddie Van Halen and Stevie Wonder. Since then over 150 more honorees have followed. Other inductees include Elvis Presley, Chuck Berry, Bo Diddly, Carole King, Alice Cooper, Holland-Dozier-Holland, Herbie Hancock, the Black Crowes, Dick Clark, Willie Dixon, Buddy Guy, KISS, John Lee Hooker, Smokey Robinson, Solomon Burke, John "Jabo" Starks, Robert Cray, Etta James, Ike Turner, Kim Se-hwang, Muddy Waters, B'z, Eric Clapton, AC/DC, Aerosmith, Alanis Morissette, B.B. King, Black Sabbath, Carlos Santana, Cheap Trick, Def Leppard, Ernie Ball, Grandmaster Flash, Iron Maiden, James Brown, Jerry Lee Lewis, Jimi Hendrix, Jimmy Page, Joan Baez, Joe Satriani, Bonnie Raitt, Kenny Loggins, Johnny Cash, Layne Staley, Little Richard, Lynyrd Skynyrd, Melissa Etheridge, Nancy Wilson, Queen, Roky Erickson, Clyde Stubblefield, Slash, The Doobie Brothers, The Wrecking Crew, Van Halen, Vince Gill, Simon Kirke, Lizzo, Nick Cave, Thin Lizzy, Judas Priest, Oasis, Mud, Korn, In Flames, Jakob Dylan, BTS, Yola and even also Chick Corea.

Media

Guitar Center Sessions
First debuting in 2010, each episode of Guitar Center Sessions showcases exclusive live performances by noteworthy artists captured in hi-definition at Guitar Center's iconic Hollywood, CA location. Some past guests have included Linkin Park, Saint Motel, Wiz Khalifa, Billy Idol, The 1975, Sum 41, Weezer, Smashing Pumpkins, Peter Gabriel, Alanis Morissette, 311, Megadeth, Snoop Dogg, Soundgarden, Seether, The Cult, Cake, Jakob Dylan, Tame Impala, Rodrigo y Gabriela, Bush, Ben Folds Five, Korn, Joan Jett, Cheap Trick, Skylar Grey, Peter Frampton, Frank Turner, J Balvin, Coheed and Cambria, Debbie Harry, Kraftwerk and Jane's Addiction. Guitar Center Sessions is hosted by Nic Harcourt, and was created, developed and produced by Guitar Center exclusively on DirecTV. Guitar Center Sessions has won several awards, including a Lumiere Award from the International 3D Society for the episodes featuring Jane's Addiction and Peter Gabriel. To celebrate their 50th anniversary, Guitar Center asked Linkin Park to play a show on October 24, 2014; the performance first aired on DirecTV on December 5, 2014.

At: Guitar Center web series
The At: Guitar Center web series (formerly At: Guitar Center podcast) features interviews and intimate performances with some of the biggest names in music. Some past guests have included Travis Barker, Sevendust, T-Pain, Joe Bonamassa, The Crystal Method, Buddy Guy, Elmer Bernstein, Daughtry, Jimmy Cliff, Meiko, Lee Jong-suk, Rza, Steve Vai, Joe Satriani, Brandi Carlile, and Minus the Bear, The podcasts are available on the iTunes, Zune and BlackBerry networks and on the Guitar Center website. The show is hosted by Nic Harcourt.

Connections Made by Guitar Center
Connections Made by Guitar Center, a collaboration between 88.5 KCSN Los Angeles and Guitar Center, was a weekly one-hour radio program hosted by radio host Nic Harcourt featuring new music from both signed and unsigned artists from across the globe and musical spectrum.

Albums recorded at Guitar Center
No Stairway by Glassine
Live at Guitar Center by Noah Wall

See also
 Music & Arts Center
 Woodwind & Brasswind

References

External links

Musician's Friend
Marty Albertson Interview NAMM Oral History Library (2012)
Richie Pidanick Interview NAMM Oral History Library (2012)
Dave Weiderman Interview NAMM Oral History Library (2012)
Ray Scherr Interview NAMM Oral History Library (2016)
Rob Eastman Interview NAMM Oral History Library (2021)

1959 establishments in California
2007 mergers and acquisitions
2014 mergers and acquisitions
American companies established in 1959
Bain Capital companies
Companies based in Westlake Village, California
Companies that filed for Chapter 11 bankruptcy in 2020
Musical instrument retailers of the United States
Private equity portfolio companies
Retail companies established in 1959
Guitars